SymPy is an open-source Python library for symbolic computation. It provides computer algebra capabilities either as a standalone application, as a library to other applications, or live on the web as SymPy Live or SymPy Gamma. SymPy is simple to install and to inspect because it is written entirely in Python with few dependencies. This ease of access combined with a simple and extensible code base in a well known language make SymPy a computer algebra system with a relatively low barrier to entry.

SymPy includes features ranging from basic symbolic arithmetic to calculus, algebra, discrete mathematics, and quantum physics. It is capable of formatting the result of the computations as LaTeX code.

SymPy is free software and is licensed under the New BSD license. The lead developers are Ondřej Čertík and Aaron Meurer. It was started in 2005 by Ondřej Čertík.

Features
The SymPy library is split into a core with many optional modules.

Currently, the core of SymPy has around 260,000 lines of code (it also includes a comprehensive set of self-tests: over 100,000 lines in 350 files as of version 0.7.5), and its capabilities include:

Core capabilities
 Basic arithmetic: *, /, +, -, **
 Simplification
 Expansion
 Functions: trigonometric, hyperbolic, exponential, roots, logarithms, absolute value, spherical harmonics, factorials and gamma functions, zeta functions, polynomials, hypergeometric, special functions, etc.
 Substitution
 Arbitrary precision integers, rationals and floats
 Noncommutative symbols
 Pattern matching

Polynomials
 Basic arithmetic: division, gcd, etc.
 Factorization
 Square-free factorization
 Gröbner bases
 Partial fraction decomposition
 Resultants

Calculus
 Limits
 Differentiation
 Integration: Implemented Risch–Norman heuristic
 Taylor series (Laurent series)

Solving equations
 Systems of linear equations
 Systems of algebraic equations that are solvable by radicals
 Differential equations
 Difference equations

Discrete math
 Binomial coefficients
 Summations
 Products
 Number theory: generating Prime numbers, primality testing, integer factorization, etc.
 Logic expressions

Matrices
 Basic arithmetic
 Eigenvalues and their eigenvectors when the characteristic polynomial is solvable by radicals
 Determinants
 Inversion
 Solving

Geometry
 Points, lines, rays, ellipses, circles, polygons, etc.
 Intersections
 Tangency
 Similarity

Plotting
Note, plotting requires the external Matplotlib or Pyglet module.

 Coordinate models
 Plotting Geometric Entities
 2D and 3D
 Interactive interface
 Colors
Animations

Physics
 Units
 Classical mechanics
Continuum mechanics
 Quantum mechanics
 Gaussian optics
 Pauli algebra
 Control

Statistics
 Normal distributions
 Uniform distributions
 Probability

Combinatorics
 Permutations
 Combinations
 Partitions
 Subsets
 Permutation group: Polyhedral, Rubik, Symmetric, etc.
 Prufer sequence and Gray codes

Printing
 Pretty-printing: ASCII/Unicode pretty-printing, LaTeX
 Code generation: C, Fortran, Python

Related projects
 SageMath: an open source alternative to Mathematica, Maple, MATLAB, and Magma (SymPy is included in Sage)
 SymEngine: a rewriting of SymPy's core in C++, in order to increase its performance. Work is currently in progress to make SymEngine the underlying engine of Sage too.
 mpmath: a Python library for arbitrary-precision floating-point arithmetic
 SympyCore: another Python computer algebra system
 SfePy: Software for solving systems of coupled partial differential equations (PDEs) by the finite element method in 1D, 2D and 3D.
GAlgebra: Geometric algebra module (previously ).
 Quameon: Quantum Monte Carlo in Python.
 Lcapy: Experimental Python package for teaching linear circuit analysis.
 LaTeX Expression project: Easy LaTeX typesetting of algebraic expressions in symbolic form with automatic substitution and result computation.
 Symbolic statistical modeling: Adding statistical operations to complex physical models.
 Diofant: a fork of SymPy, started by Sergey B Kirpichev

Dependencies
Since version 1.0, SymPy has the mpmath package as a dependency.

There are several optional dependencies that can enhance its capabilities:

 : If  is installed, SymPy's polynomial module will automatically use it for faster ground types. This can provide a several times boost in performance of certain operations.
 matplotlib: If matplotlib is installed, SymPy can use it for plotting.
 Pyglet: Alternative plotting package.

Usage examples

Pretty-printing
Sympy allows outputs to be formatted into a more appealing format through the pprint function. Alternatively, the init_printing() method will enable pretty-printing, so pprint need not be called. Pretty-printing will use unicode symbols when available in the current environment, otherwise it will fall back to ASCII characters.
>>> from sympy import pprint, init_printing, Symbol, sin, cos, exp, sqrt, series, Integral, Function
>>>
>>> x = Symbol("x")
>>> y = Symbol("y")
>>> f = Function("f")
>>> # pprint will default to unicode if available
>>> pprint(x ** exp(x))
 ⎛ x⎞
 ⎝ℯ ⎠
x   
>>> # An output without unicode
>>> pprint(Integral(f(x), x), use_unicode=False)
  /       
 |        
 | f(x) dx
 |        
/        
>>> # Compare with same expression but this time unicode is enabled
>>> pprint(Integral(f(x), x), use_unicode=True)
⌠        
⎮ f(x) dx
⌡     
>>> # Alternatively, you can call init_printing() once and pretty-print without the pprint function.
>>> init_printing()
>>> sqrt(sqrt(exp(x)))
   
4 ╱  x 
╲╱  ℯ  
>>> (1/cos(x)).series(x, 0, 10)
     2      4       6        8         
    x    5⋅x    61⋅x    277⋅x     ⎛ 10⎞
1 + ── + ──── + ───── + ────── + O⎝x  ⎠
    2     24     720     8064

Expansion
>>> from sympy import init_printing, Symbol, expand
>>> init_printing()
>>>
>>> a = Symbol("a")
>>> b = Symbol("b")
>>> e = (a + b) ** 3
>>> e
(a + b)³
>>> e.expand()
a³ + 3⋅a²⋅b + 3⋅a⋅b²  + b³

Arbitrary-precision example
>>> from sympy import Rational, pprint
>>> e = 2**50 / Rational(10) ** 50
>>> pprint(e)
1/88817841970012523233890533447265625

Differentiation
>>> from sympy import init_printing, symbols, ln, diff
>>> init_printing()
>>> x, y = symbols("x y")
>>> f = x**2 / y + 2 * x - ln(y)
>>> diff(f, x)
 2⋅x    
 ─── + 2
  y 
>>> diff(f, y)
    2    
   x    1
 - ── - ─
    2   y
   y
>>> diff(diff(f, x), y)
 -2⋅x
 ────
   2 
  y

Plotting

>>> from sympy import symbols, cos
>>> from sympy.plotting import plot3d
>>> x, y = symbols("x y")
>>> plot3d(cos(x * 3) * cos(y * 5) - y, (x, -1, 1), (y, -1, 1))
<sympy.plotting.plot.Plot object at 0x3b6d0d0>

Limits
>>> from sympy import init_printing, Symbol, limit, sqrt, oo
>>> init_printing()
>>> 
>>> x = Symbol("x")
>>> limit(sqrt(x**2 - 5 * x + 6) - x, x, oo)
-5/2
>>> limit(x * (sqrt(x**2 + 1) - x), x, oo)
1/2
>>> limit(1 / x**2, x, 0)
∞
>>> limit(((x - 1) / (x + 1)) ** x, x, oo)
 -2
ℯ

Differential equations
>>> from sympy import init_printing, Symbol, Function, Eq, dsolve, sin, diff
>>> init_printing()
>>>
>>> x = Symbol("x")
>>> f = Function("f")
>>>
>>> eq = Eq(f(x).diff(x), f(x))
>>> eq
d              
──(f(x)) = f(x)
dx         
>>>    
>>> dsolve(eq, f(x))
           x
f(x) = C₁⋅ℯ

>>>
>>> eq = Eq(x**2 * f(x).diff(x), -3 * x * f(x) + sin(x) / x)
>>> eq
 2 d                      sin(x)
x ⋅──(f(x)) = -3⋅x⋅f(x) + ──────
   dx                       x   
>>>
>>> dsolve(eq, f(x))
       C₁ - cos(x)
f(x) = ───────────   
            x³

Integration
>>> from sympy import init_printing, integrate, Symbol, exp, cos, erf
>>> init_printing()
>>> x = Symbol("x")
>>> # Polynomial Function
>>> f = x**2 + x + 1
>>> f
 2        
x  + x + 1
>>> integrate(f, x)
 3    2    
x    x     
── + ── + x
3    2     
>>> # Rational Function
>>> f = x / (x**2 + 2 * x + 1)
>>> f
     x      
────────────
 2          
x  + 2⋅x + 1

>>> integrate(f, x)
               1  
log(x + 1) + ─────
             x + 1
>>> # Exponential-polynomial functions
>>> f = x**2 * exp(x) * cos(x)
>>> f
 2  x       
x ⋅ℯ ⋅cos(x)
>>> integrate(f, x)
 2  x           2  x                         x           x       
x ⋅ℯ ⋅sin(x)   x ⋅ℯ ⋅cos(x)      x          ℯ ⋅sin(x)   ℯ ⋅cos(x)
──────────── + ──────────── - x⋅ℯ ⋅sin(x) + ───────── - ─────────
     2              2                           2           2    
>>> # A non-elementary integral
>>> f = exp(-(x**2)) * erf(x)
>>> f
   2       
 -x        
ℯ   ⋅erf(x)
>>> integrate(f, x)

  ___    2   
╲╱ π ⋅erf (x)
─────────────
      4

Series
>>> from sympy import Symbol, cos, sin, pprint
>>> x = Symbol("x")
>>> e = 1 / cos(x)
>>> pprint(e)
  1   
──────
cos(x)
>>> pprint(e.series(x, 0, 10))
     2      4       6        8         
    x    5⋅x    61⋅x    277⋅x     ⎛ 10⎞
1 + ── + ──── + ───── + ────── + O⎝x  ⎠
    2     24     720     8064          
>>> e = 1/sin(x)
>>> pprint(e)
  1   
──────
sin(x)
>>> pprint(e.series(x, 0, 4))
           3        
1   x   7⋅x     ⎛ 4⎞
─ + ─ + ──── + O⎝x ⎠
x   6   360

Logical reasoning

Example 1 
>>> from sympy import *
>>> x = Symbol("x")
>>> y = Symbol("y")
>>> facts = Q.positive(x), Q.positive(y)
>>> with assuming(*facts):
...     print(ask(Q.positive(2 * x + y)))
True

Example 2 
>>> from sympy import *
>>> x = Symbol("x")
>>> # Assumption about x
>>> fact = [Q.prime(x)]
>>> with assuming(*fact):
...     print(ask(Q.rational(1 / x)))
True

See also

 Comparison of computer algebra systems

References

External links
 
 Planet SymPy
 SymPy Tutorials Collection
 Code Repository on GitHub
 Support and development forum
 Gitter chat room

Articles with example Python (programming language) code
Computer algebra system software for Linux
Computer algebra system software for macOS
Computer algebra system software for Windows
Free computer algebra systems
Free mathematics software
Free software programmed in Python
Python (programming language) scientific libraries